The 60th Texas Legislature met from January 10, 1967, to May 29, 1967, and again in a special called session from June 4, 1968, to July 3, 1968. All members present during this session were elected in the 1966 general elections. The Democrats retained control of the Legislature.

Sessions
 Regular session: January 10 – May 29, 1967
 Called session: June 4 – July 3, 1968

Party summary

Senate

House

Officers

Senate
 Lieutenant Governor: Preston Smith (D)
 President Pro Tempore (regular session): Bill Patman (D)
 President Pro Tempore (called session): James S. Bates (D)

House
 Speaker of the House: Ben Barnes (D)

Members

Senate

Dist. 1
 A. M. Aikin Jr. (D), Paris

Dist. 2
 Jack Strong (D), Longview

Dist. 3
 Charlie Wilson (D), Lufkin

Dist. 4
 D. Roy Harrington (D), Port Arthur

Dist. 5
 William T. Moore (D), Bryan

Dist. 6
 Criss Cole (D), Houston

Dist. 7
 Chet Brooks (D), Pasadena

Dist. 8
 O. H. Harris (R), Dallas

Dist. 9
 Ralph Hall (D), Rockwall

Dist. 10
 Don Kennard (D), Fort Worth

Dist. 11
 Barbara Jordan (D), Houston

Dist. 12
 J. P. Word (D), Meridian

Dist. 13
 Murray Watson Jr. (D), Waco

Dist. 14
 Charles F. Herring (D), Austin

Dist. 15
 Henry Grover (R), Houston

Dist. 16
 Jim Wade (D), Dallas

Dist. 17
 A. R. Schwartz (D), Galveston

Dist. 18
 Bill Patman (D), Ganado

Dist. 19
 V. E. Berry (D), San Antonio

Dist. 20
 Bruce Reagan (D), Corpus Christi

Dist. 21
 Wayne Connally (D), Floresville

Dist. 22
 Tom Creighton (D), Mineral Wells

Dist. 23
 Oscar Mauzy (D), Dallas

Dist. 24
 David Ratliff (D), Stamford

Dist. 25
 Dorsey B. Hardeman (D), San Angelo

Dist. 26
 Joe J. Bernal (D), San Antonio

Dist. 27
 James Bates (D), Edinburg

Dist. 28
 H. J. Blanchard (D), Lubbock

Dist. 29
 Joe Christie (D), El Paso

Dist. 30
 Jack Hightower (D), Vernon

Dist. 31
 Grady Hazlewood (D), Canyon

House

External links

60th Texas Legislature
1967 in Texas
1968 in Texas
1967 U.S. legislative sessions
1968 U.S. legislative sessions